Robert "Buboy" Tamayo Villar, Jr. (born March 21, 1998) is a Filipino actor, comedian, host and singer. He is currently signed under GMA's talent agency Sparkle.

Early life
Robert Tamayo Villar, Jr. was born on March 21, 1998, in Cebu City but raised in Metro Manila. He is the son of Robert Villar, Sr. As of April 2016, Villar is in a relationship with Angillyn Serrano Gorens, an American. Villar stated in July 2017 that he and Gorens, with both their parents' approval, had been living together. Villar began dating Gorens in 2015, but it was not until February 2016 that their relationship became official. On September 1, 2017, Gorens gave birth to the couple's child, a girl. Villar has also revealed his intention to marry Gorens in the United States in that same year. But as of 2018 they are separated but not divorced.

Career

His first television appearance was when he auditioned in ABS-CBN's Little Big Star. He is also a member of the youngest boy band in the Philippines, the Mak and the Dudes. Villar's breakthrough performance was in Dyesebel in 2008. He has appeared in high-profile films such as Supahpapalicious, Shake, Rattle & Roll X, Ang Panday, and Philippine dramas such as Zaido: Pulis Pangkalawakan, Darna, and Panday Kids.

Filmography

Television

Films

Discography

Awards and nominations

References

External links
 

1999 births
Living people
ABS-CBN personalities
GMA Network personalities
Filipino child singers
Filipino emigrants to the United States
Filipino male child actors
Filipino male comedians
Filipino male film actors
Filipino male television actors
Singing talent show winners
Participants in Philippine reality television series
People from Cebu
Visayan people
21st-century Filipino male actors
21st-century Filipino singers
Filipino television presenters
Filipino television variety show hosts